119 may refer to:

 119 (number), a natural number
 119 (emergency telephone number)
 AD 119, a year in the 2nd century AD
 119 BC, a year in the 2nd century BC
 119 (album), 2012
 119 (NCT song)
119 (Show Me the Money song)
 119 (film), a Japanese film, see Naoto Takenaka#Film
 119 (MBTA bus)
 List of highways numbered 119

See also

 11/9 (disambiguation)
 911 (disambiguation)
 Ununennium, a hypothetical chemical element with atomic number 119